The Letterkenny Post (formerly the Letterkenny Leader) is a freesheet newspaper published by Iconic Newspapers in Letterkenny, County Donegal. It was the first paper from River Media. The newspaper specialises in property, motoring, entertainment, farming and fashion. Its offices are located at the Dry Arch Business Park, Bonagee. The paper also publishes a free digital copy of the paper through its website.

History
It was published weekly from 1 September 2005 with close to €700,000 being invested in its weekly publication.
This publication has stopped publishing.

Ownership
The newspaper was owned by River Media. In November 2018, it was acquired by Iconic Newspapers.

References

External links
 The Letterkenny Post
 Media Alive
 River Media Expands

2005 establishments in Ireland
People
Newspapers established in 2005
Newspapers published in the Republic of Ireland
Weekly newspapers published in Ireland